The Uatsamonga Order is a state award of South Ossetia. It was established in 2007. As of February 2015, it has no legislative support. In 2010, the Union of Knights of the Order was formed. The order is named after the mythological artifact Uatsamonga, mentioned in the Ossetian Nart epic.

Many veterans of the Russo-Georgian War were awarded with the order, which afforded some veterans the highest paying pension.

Statute 
The order is awarded by the President of South Ossetia for displaying heroism and performing feats during the military conflicts. In May 2012, a meeting of the Knights of the Order discussed the draft law on the status of the award, which was planned to be submitted for consideration by the government on June 10 of the same year. In particular, it was assumed that persons awarded this order will be able to count on free medical care, education, travel in public transport and the receipt or construction of real estate. The order is awarded to cities when they are awarded the title Hero City.

Since 2019, holders of the order receive monthly payments to be added to salaries and/or pensions.

Short description 
The ribbon of the order consists of three equally wide alternating stripes, two red and one white, with a yellow border on the sides. The insignia looks like an eight-pointed silver star, partially covered with ruby enamel, with two gold crossed swords. On the central medallion, in a circle on white enamel, is the motto of the order and the image of a laurel branch. In the center of the medallion there is a golden relief image of a bowl.

List of recipients

See also 

 Orders, decorations, and medals of South Ossetia

References 

Orders, decorations, and medals
South Ossetia